Christopher William Martin (born January 17, 1975), also known as Corky Martin or Chris Martin, is a Canadian actor. He has appeared on a number of television series, including Felicity and The L Word, as well as leading the 2002 Canadian series, Tom Stone.

Early life
Martin was born in Burnaby, British Columbia, Canada, the son of Victoria Kathleen and Chris William Martin. He attended McRoberts Secondary School followed by Richmond High School in Richmond, British Columbia. He is also an alum of Ideal Mini School in Vancouver.

Career
His first role was in the 1991 teen drama series Fifteen, filmed in Vancouver. His performance as Dylan received a nomination for Best Actor at the Youth in Film Awards. Notably, he also convinced his one-time Fifteen co-star, a young Ryan Reynolds, to give acting a second try at a time when he had given up on the career to focus on studies at Kwantlen Polytechnic University; the two then moved to Los Angeles together to further their career opportunities. After the end of the series, he played the role of Jamie Novak in the 1993 high school drama Madison, for which he received a Gemini Award nomination for Best Actor in a Drama Series at the 11th Gemini Awards in 1996. 

In his early acting roles he was credited as just Chris Martin, but began going by Chris William Martin in the 2000s, likely to avoid potential confusion with musician Chris Martin of Coldplay.

In 1999, he starred in Carl Bessai's film Johnny, for which he won a special jury citation for his performance at the 1999 Toronto International Film Festival. He has gone on to work with Bessai on two subsequent films: Lola in 2001, and Emile in 2003. He appeared in the 2002 film Try Seventeen along with Elijah Wood and Mandy Moore, and played the title character in the drama series Tom Stone from 2002 to 2004. 

Later, in 2004, he appeared as the main character in The Volcano Disaster. He has also appeared on several television series including Tru Calling, Intelligence, The Vampire Diaries, and Supernatural.

Apart from movies and television, he appeared in Alanis Morissette's music videos "Everything" and "Crazy".

Filmography

Film

Television

References

External links
 

1975 births
Living people
Canadian male film actors
Canadian male television actors
Canadian male voice actors
People from Burnaby
Male actors from British Columbia